Cherukuvada Sri Ranganadha Raju is the Ex-Minister of Housing in Y. S. Jagan Mohan Reddy's government of Andhra Pradesh, India. He was elected to the Andhra Pradesh Legislative Assembly from Achanta constituency in the 2019 assembly election.

References 

Year of birth missing (living people)
Living people
Andhra Pradesh MLAs 2019–2024
State cabinet ministers of Andhra Pradesh
People from West Godavari district
YSR Congress Party politicians